Flying Lessons is a 2010 American drama film directed by Derek Magyar and starring Maggie Grace, Christine Lahti, Cary Elwes, Jonathan Tucker and Hal Holbrook.

Synopsis 

Sophie Conway returns home amidst life-struggles and is faced with abandoned friends, a messy relationship with her mother, and an Alzheimer's Disease patient named Harry Pleasant.

Cast
Cary Elwes as Steven Jennings
Maggie Grace as Sophie Conway
Nikki DeLoach as Mila
Joanna Cassidy as Totty Kuspert
Christine Lahti as Caroline Conway
Jonathan Tucker as Billy
Hal Holbrook as Harry Pleasant

References

External links
 
 

American drama films
2010s English-language films
2010s American films